Elephant Butte Reservoir is a reservoir on the southern part of the Rio Grande in the U.S. state of New Mexico,  north of Truth or Consequences. The reservoir is the 84th largest man-made lake in the United States and the largest in New Mexico by total surface area and peak volume. It is the only place in New Mexico that one can find pelicans perched on or alongside the lake. There are also temporary US Coast Guard bases stationed at Elephant Butte. It is impounded by Elephant Butte Dam and is part of the largest state park in New Mexico, Elephant Butte Lake State Park.

The reservoir is part of the Rio Grande Project to provide power and irrigation to south-central New Mexico and western Texas. It began to be filled in 1915 and 1916 and at highstand was the largest man-made lake in the world.

The reservoir can hold  of water from a drainage of 28,900 square miles (74,850 km2). It provides irrigation to 178,000 acres (720 km2) of land.

Fishing is a popular recreational activity on the reservoir, which contains striped bass, white bass, largemouth bass, crappie, walleye and catfish.

Etymology
The reservoir, dam, and surrounding area are named after a volcanic core, "Elephant Butte," similarly to Devils Tower, in Wyoming. It is now an island in the lake when the water levels are high. The butte was said to have the shape of an elephant lying on its side.

Dam construction and history

The proposed dam featured in the 1906 Boundary Waters Convention between the United States and Mexico, which specified how much water should be delivered to Mexico after the dam's completion.

Elephant Butte Dam was constructed between 1911 and 1916, with the reservoir fill starting in 1915. It was a major engineering feat in its day, and the enormous concrete dam is the major feature of the Elephant Butte National Register Historic District. New Mexico State Parks operates a visitor center, which contains information on the construction of the dam. It was the second-largest irrigation dam ever built at the time of its construction and was surpassed only in 1970 by the Aswan Dam in Egypt, and the reservoir was the largest man-made lake on earth.

A large construction community sprang up, which included two worker camps, railways, water tanks, cableway systems, and the former administration building of the Bureau of Reclamation. The "camps" housed American and Mexican workers throughout the dam's construction. One of the former camps ended up under the reservoir itself; the other disappeared altogether. Moreover, many centuries-old communities and farming villages were "obliterated" by the filling of the reservoir and now lie at the bottom, including complete stone structures. Over 2,000 people were displaced by the filling of the reservoir.

When the reservoir started filling in 1915, irrigation use downstream was much more limited than today, which allowed the lake to remain relatively full. The lake experienced highstand for the first time in May 1942. That was the deepest highstand on record and stained the inundated landscape white with gypsum and other minerals and deposited sediments in the surrounding hills. In 1946, new irrigation infrastructure allowed heavy use of the water for farming downstream. By 1950, the "full production" use, coupled with intense drought in the upper basin, had caused the water levels to fall well below the initial 1915 levels. The lowest recorded storage level occurred on August 6, 1954. Another longer-lived highstand occurred in July 1985 and lasted with the spillway in use until 1988. Other highstands occurred in 1994 and 1995. Most of the photographs showing a full lake are from that relatively wet period. Drought has persisted since then, and as of February 2022, water levels have never recovered. 

The American kidnapper and torturer David Parker Ray tortured his victims in his "toy box" trailer near the reservoir between 1957 and 1999. He is suspected of killing his victims and disposing of the bodies in the lake, but one survivor he had thought he killed was left near the American-Mexico border. Officials have conducted searches for his victims at the lake but have not found any human remains there or elsewhere that are related to Ray's activities. 

The former administration building of the Bureau of Reclamation still stands as a bed and breakfast facility. Along with other structures of the time, it is listed in the National Register of Historic Places. When the lake falls over 10 meters (30 feet) below maximum capacity, the ruins of the old machine shop and power plant are out of the water. Located near the southeastern shore, the 3000 square-foot concrete structure was once believed to be the remnants of the old field hospital that served the frequently-injured dam construction crew. That building is actually farther upstream in the aptly-named "Hospital Canyon." Plans are underway to make the machine shop ruins a scuba destination in years with a high water level.

In 2014, a group celebrating a bachelor party on the exposed sediments of the lake discovered the head and tusks of a 3.2-million-year-old stegomastodon, a relative of actual elephants, in excellent condition. That is one of the most complete finds of a stegomastodon in the area. The skull is on display at the New Mexico Museum of Natural History and Science.

Gallery

References

External links

Elephant Butte Lake State Park
Elephant Butte Chamber of Commerce

Reservoirs in New Mexico
Rio Grande
Bodies of water of Sierra County, New Mexico
Buildings and structures in Sierra County, New Mexico
Historic American Engineering Record in New Mexico
Protected areas of Sierra County, New Mexico